The 2011 Ms. Olympia contest was an IFBB professional bodybuilding competition and part of Joe Weider's Olympia Fitness & Performance Weekend 2011 was held on September 16, 2011, at the South Hall in the Las Vegas Convention Center in Winchester, Nevada and in the Orleans Arena at The Orleans Hotel and Casino in Paradise, Nevada.  It was the 32nd Ms. Olympia competition held.  Other events at the exhibition included the 212 Olympia Showdown, Mr. Olympia, Fitness Olympia, Figure Olympia, and Bikini Olympia contests.

Prize money
1st $28,000
2nd $14,000
3rd $8,000
4th $5,000
5th $3,000
6th $2,000
Total: $60,000

Results
 1st - Iris Kyle
 2nd - Yaxeni Oriquen-Garcia
 3rd - Brigita Brezovac
 4th - Debi Laszewski
 5th - Alina Popa
 6th - Sheila Bleck
 7th - Kim Perez
 8th - Nicole Ball
 9th - Monique Jones
 10th - Tina Chandler
 11th - Kim Buck
 12th - Heather Foster
 13th - Cathy LeFrançois
 14th - Helle Trevino
 15th - Skadi Frei-Seifert
 16th - Dayana Cadeau
 17th - Mah Ann Mendoza

Comparison to previous Olympia results:
Same - Iris Kyle
Same - Yaxeni Oriquen-Garcia
-1 - Debi Laszewski
+1 - Alina Popa
-2 - Sheila Bleck
-2 - Tina Chandler
+6 - Heather Foster
-6 - Cathy LeFrançois
-9 - Helle Trevino
-11 - Dayana Cadeau

Scorecard

Attended
14th Ms. Olympia attended - Yaxeni Oriquen-Garcia
13th Ms. Olympia attended - Iris Kyle
12th Ms. Olympia attended - Dayana Cadeau
5th Ms. Olympia attended - Cathy LeFrançois
4th Ms. Olympia attended - Heather Foster
3rd Ms. Olympia attended - Debi Laszewski and Tina Chandler
2nd Ms. Olympia attended - Sheila Bleck and Helle Trevino
1st Ms. Olympia attended - Alina Popa, Brigita Brezovac, Nicole Ball, Monique Jones, Kim Buck, Skadi Frei-Seifert, and Mah Ann Mendoza
Previous year Olympia attendees who did not attend - Helen Bouchard and Zoa Linsey

Notable events
This was Iris Kyle's 7th overall and 6th consecutive Ms. Olympia win, thus tying Cory Everson and Lenda Murray's record of six consecutive Ms. Olympia wins.
This was Dayana Cadeau's last Olympia she competed in before she retired from bodybuilding.
The song played during the posedown was Rihanna - S&M Remix by Britney Spears.
This is the first Ms. Olympia to introduce the point qualification system.

2011 Ms. Olympia Qualified

From the 2010 Ms. Olympia

Las Vegas, Nevada, USA, September 24

1. Iris Kyle, 

2. Yaxeni Oriquen-Garcia, 

3. Debi Laszewski, 

4. Sheila Bleck, 

5. Dayana Cadeau, 

6. Heather Foster, 

From the 2011 Ms. International

Columbus, Ohio USA, March 4

1. Iris Kyle, 

2. Yaxeni Oriquen-Garcia, 

3. Alina Popa, 

4. Debi Laszewski, 

5. Betty Viana-Adkins, 

6. Cathy LeFrancois, 

From the 2011 FIBO Power Pro Championships

Essen, Germany, April 16

1. Helle Trevino, 

2. Skada Frei-Seifert, 

3. Cathy LeFrancois, 

From the 2011 Toronto Pro Super Show

Toronto, Canada, June 17

1. Brigita Brezovac, 

2. Nicole Ball, 

3. Mah Ann Mendoza, 

From the 2011 Pro Bodybuilding Weekly Championships

Tampa, Florida, USA, June 25

1. Cathy LeFrancois, 

2. Tina Chandler, 

3. Brigita Brezovac, 

From the 2011 Europa Battle of Champions

Hartford, Connecticut, USA, July 30

1. Kim Buck, 

2. Monique Jones, 

3. Kim Perez,

See also
 2011 Mr. Olympia

References

2011 in bodybuilding
Ms. Olympia
Ms. Olympia
History of female bodybuilding
Ms. Olympia 2011